Fred Allen (December 16, 1896 – May 22, 1955) was an American film editor, and occasional director and writer.

Born in Petaluma, California, Allen was active from 1921 through 1955, and is credited with editing over 100 movies. In silent films, he worked with Mack Sennett and Thomas H. Ince, and appears to be most active at Republic Pictures and RKO Radio Pictures. His seven directorial credits are all Westerns.

Selected filmography

 Shadows of Conscience (1921)
 Bulldog Courage (1922)
 Brand of Cowardice (1925)
The Glorious Trail (1928)
 The Code of the Scarlet (1928)
 Cheyenne (1929)
 Señor Americano (1929)
 The Wagon Master (1929)
 Pardon My Gun (1930)
 Oklahoma Cyclone (1930)
 A Woman of Experience (1931)
 Freighters of Destiny (1931) – producer and director
 Ride Him, Cowboy (1932)
 Beyond the Rockies (1932)
 Charlie Chan in Reno (1939)
 Secrets of Scotland Yard (1944)
 Scotland Yard Investigator (1945)
 Gangs of the Waterfront (1945)
 Calendar Girl (1947)
 T-Men (1947)
 Love from a Stranger (1947)
 The Vicious Years (1950)
 Gold Raiders (1951)
 I Dream of Jeanie (1952)
 City That Never Sleeps (1953)
 Champ for a Day (1953)
 The Atomic Kid (1954)
 Make Haste to Live (1954)
 Hell's Half Acre (1954)
 The Eternal Sea (1955)

References

External links 
 

1896 births
1955 deaths
American film editors
People from Petaluma, California
Place of death missing
Writers from California